Bryan Air Force Base is a former United States Air Force base in unincorporated Brazos County, Texas, located just west of Bryan.  Today, the location houses The Texas A&M University System RELLIS Campus.

Bryan Air Force Base was originally activated in 1943 as a U.S. Army Air Forces installation known as Bryan Army Air Field. The base housed a flight instructors' school and was assigned the task of developing a standardized system of instrument flight training. The Full Panel Attitude System developed at the base was one of the most significant contributions the base made to pilot training. The instrument training school at Bryan AAF was the only one of its kind in the United States Army Air Forces.

The installation became Bryan Air Force Base upon the establishment of the U.S. Air Force as a separate service in September 1947.  Assigned to the Air Training Command, it conducted advanced flight training in the T-33 Shooting Star.  Deactivated in May 1961, the land and buildings were leased to the Texas A&M University in 1962, and in 1988 full ownership of the former base was transferred to Texas A&M University at virtually no cost.

See also

 Texas World War II Army Airfields
 77th Flying Training Wing (World War II)

References

 Manning, Thomas A. (2005), History of Air Education and Training Command, 1942–2002.  Office of History and Research, Headquarters, AETC, Randolph AFB, Texas 
 Shaw, Frederick J. (2004), Locating Air Force Base Sites, History’s Legacy, Air Force History and Museums Program, United States Air Force, Washington DC.

External links
 Bryan Air Force Base| The Handbook of Texas Online| Texas State Historical Association (TSHA)

1942 establishments in Texas
Installations of the United States Air Force in Texas
Military installations closed in 1961
Defunct airports in Texas
Airfields of the United States Army Air Forces in Texas
Buildings and structures in Brazos County, Texas
Bryan, Texas
1947 disestablishments in Texas
1951 establishments in Texas
1961 disestablishments in Texas